Rivers Casino is the name of several casinos operated by Rush Street Gaming, including:

Rivers Casino (Des Plaines)
Rivers Casino Philadelphia
Rivers Casino (Pittsburgh)
Rivers Casino (Schenectady)